Luo Haiqiong (born 10 August 1973) is a Chinese actress.

Biography
Luo Haiqiong enrolled in Gansu Art School when she was just 12. After three years of studying dancing, she worked for Lanzhou Art Troupe for 4 years. In December 1994, after a performance at the Shanghai Theatre Academy in Shanghai, she was encouraged by a faculty to apply to that school to become an actress. She did and was accepted in 1995, where she became a classmate of Lu Yi. Her breakout came in 2001 for starring in the TV series Love Story in Shanghai, which made her famous domestically.

Filmography

Film

TV series

Awards and nominations

Personal life
Luo Haiqiong married vice president of Huayi Brothers Fei Qi on January 24, 2010.

References

External links

20th-century Chinese actresses
21st-century Chinese actresses
Actresses from Gansu
People from Lanzhou
1973 births
Living people
Shanghai Theatre Academy alumni
Chinese film actresses
Chinese television actresses